Savannah Paige Outen (born October 14, 1992) is an American singer who gained popularity on YouTube. Outen began posting videos of herself singing on YouTube in March 2007 along with Angelika Vee and Esmée Denters. In 2010 she collaborated with Boyce Avenue on their sixth acoustic album, New Acoustic Sessions. She appeared in the 85th Annual Macy's Thanksgiving Day Parade on November 24, 2011.

Music
Outen has been asked to sing the National Anthem at many professional sports venues, including the Oakland Raiders, Los Angeles Dodgers, Anaheim Angels, Seattle Mariners, Seattle SuperSonics, Seattle Storm, and the Portland Beavers. From 2002 to 2006 she was a member of the Junior BlazerDancers dance group. In 2006, she won the youth talent contest at the Washington County Fair in her hometown.

In fall 2007, Keith Thomas of Levosia Entertainment signed Outen to a recording and management contract. Savannah's first single from the three demo CD released by Levosia Entertainment was "Goodbyes". That song drew comparisons to Carrie Underwood and Britney Spears from MTV's Pop Cultured. Outen's first video was a cover of the song "Listen" from the motion picture Dreamgirls.

On May 31, 2008, Outen's first single, "Goodbyes", was featured on Radio Disney's Music Mailbag. She received a 95% pick and on June 2, the song was added to the Radio Disney playlist. Within two weeks, it debuted at #28 on the Top 30 Countdown, charting for 18 straight weeks and peaking at #5, making it the highest rated song an unsigned artist has ever achieved on Radio Disney. Her latest song, "Fighting For My Life", was on the music mailbag on October 31, 2009 and got a 98% pick by listeners. She reached 19 million views on her YouTube account by October 2008.

Outen removed her cover songs from YouTube on March 17, 2009, due to concerns over copyright violations but returned them a short time later.

On April 3, 2009, the music video to her second single, "If You Only Knew" was posted on YouTube. It was directed by Mason Dixon, who also directed her first music video for "Goodbyes", and starred Disney Channel's Tony Oller (As The Bell Rings) as "Cas". It has since garnered more than 4 million views. In December 2009, clothing designed by Outen for Primp Girl went on sale, with the profits from the sales given to a charity selected by Outen.

Biography
Savannah Outen was born on October 14, 1992 to Barry and Lisa Outen. Outen's hometown is Hillsboro, Oregon, in the Portland metropolitan area. There she attended Century High School, but as of 2009 is home schooled by her parents. She graduated early. At age 12, Outen made it to the finals of "America's Best New Talent".

"Goodbyes" was released in 2008 on iTunes. She wrote "Goodbyes" during her middle school graduation about a friend who was moving to a different high school from her.

"So What" and "Tell Me It's True" were recorded by a Local Producer and are in a Universal Records Music Catalog. According to her parents, they were supposed to be used as Demos for record labels. But according to her ex-manager, Keith Thomas, he received acoustic versions of 3 songs: "Goodbyes", "Unlock The Door" (later a free single at her extinct website SavannahOfficial.com) and "My Dream Is".

"Goodbyes" is on Radio Disney Jams, Vol. 11. It peaked 5 at Radio Disney Countdown, making her the first unsigned artist to reach this position at that radio. It got a music video directed by Mason Dixon, shot in Nashville.

"Fighting for My Life" was on Radio Disney music mailbag and got picked with 95% approval.

Savannah appeared in the first five Rising Stars Webshow episodes, part of the popular online Radio Disney fansite, Radio Disney Club. One out of five episodes are currently online, after the club was hacked. Savannah posted about the webshow on her Twitter page the night it debuted and two weeks later. A cover of the song "No Place Like Here" from the straight to DVD film "Quest for Zhu" (which was served as the film's theme song) can be heard on the film's official soundtrack as a Bonus Track. Savannah appeared on the Radio Disney Club on November 25, 2011, in celebration of their fourth birthday, in a follow-up interview.

Billboard's website visitors named Outen as one of the six finalists to perform at the Billboard 2012 Battle of the Bands. She performed on May 18, 2012 in the showdown alongside her competition Saints of Valory, Patent Pending, After the Smoke, Take the Day, and Doe Eye, but did not win. Outen also made a small cameo appearance in the December 2012 Judd Apatow movie This is 40.

Filmography

Film

TV series

Other roles

Discography

Albums
2010: Inception
2012: Sing To Me (EP)

Cover albums
2012: The Covers, Volume I
2012: The Covers II
2012: The Covers, Volume III
2012: Josh Golden & Savannah Outen Covers (EP)
2013: The Covers IV
2013: The Covers V
2013: The New Velvet & Savannah Outen (EP)
2013: The Covers VI
2014: The Covers VII

Singles
2008: Unlock The Door
2008: Goodbyes
2009: A Greater Treasure Than A Friend
2009: If You Only Knew
2009: Hope And Prayer
2009: Fighting For My Life
2010: Be Original
2010: The Song Of Christmas Time
2010: Magical Season (feat. Anna Golden)
2011: Tonight With You (with Josh Golden)
2011: No Place Like Here
2012: I've Got You
2012: Remember Me (with Jake Coco)
2013: Brave & True (for Music is Medicine)
2013: Fairytales Of L.A
2014: Closure
2015: Boys
2017: Coins
2018: Sad in the Summer
2018: Shortcut
2018: Christmas (Baby Please Come Home)
2019: The Hard Way
2019: Have Yourself a Merry Little Christmas
2020: A Puro Dolor (with Lionel Ferro)
2020: Never Be New York
2020: Lonely Together (The Quarantine Song)
2021: What Are We
2021: What Are We (Acoustic version)
2021: Wish I Didn't Know
2022: Wait For the Sun
2022: Willow Tree (with Steve Horner)

Unreleased songs
My Dream Is
So What
Tell Me It's True
Something To Say
I Like Boys
That's News To Me

Soundtracks
2008: Radio Disney Jams, Vol. 11 (with Goodbyes)
2009: Tinker Bell and the Lost Treasure (with A Greater Treasure Than A Friend)
2010: DisneyMania 7 (with Little Wonders)
2010: The Karma Club (Original Book Soundtrack) (with Kick Her to the Curb, Can't Take It Back and Take Pity)

Music videos
2008: Goodbyes directed by Mason Dixon
2009: If You Only Knew directed by Mason Dixon
2011: Tonight With You directed by Joe Fahey
2011: Moves Like Jagger directed by Jimmy Bates
2011: No Place Like Here directed by Jimmy Bates
2011: Silent Night directed by Jimmy Bates
2012: Fairytales Of L.A. directed by Julien Garros and Jake Coco
2013: Closure directed by Jade Ehlers and Wade Yamaguchi
2015: Boys directed by Sherif Higazy
2016: Silent Night
2017: I'll Be Home For Christmas
2018: Sad in the Summer directed by Roxana Baldovin
2018: Shortcut
2019: The Hard Way directed by Ryan Espinosa
2019: Have Yourself a Merry Little Christmas
2021: Wish I Didn't Know directed by Spencer Sutherland and Caden Huston

References

American women pop singers
Living people
Musicians from Hillsboro, Oregon
Internet memes
Singers from Oregon
Year of birth missing (living people)
21st-century American women